Leonard J. Goldberg (January 24, 1934 – December 4, 2019) was an American film and television producer. He had his own production company, Panda Productions (formerly Mandy Films, and earlier Daydream Productions when he was working with Jerry Weintraub). He served as head of programming for ABC, and was president of 20th Century Fox. Goldberg was also the executive producer of the CBS series Blue Bloods.

Early life and education
Goldberg was born on January 24, 1934, to a Jewish family,  the son of Jean (née Smith) and William Goldberg. He was a graduate of New Utrecht High School in Brooklyn and the Wharton School at the University of Pennsylvania where he received a B.S. in economics in 1955.

Career
As a producer, he was responsible for producing several television films, including the Peabody Award–⁠winning Brian's Song (1971) and The Boy in the Plastic Bubble (1976); the latter helping to launch John Travolta's movie career. He also produced a string of hit television series while in partnership with Aaron Spelling; the best-known being Charlie's Angels, Hart to Hart, Starsky & Hutch, Fantasy Island and Family. He produced the Oscar-nominated movie WarGames (1983) as well as the comedy The Bad News Bears in Breaking Training (1977). He also partnered with producer Jerry Weintraub in the late 1970s, working on the television show When the Whistle Blows, and had development contracts with ABC and Universal Pictures. In 1981, he received an agreement with MGM/UA Entertainment Co. to produce and distribute TV shows as well as feature films under the Mandy Productions (later Mandy Films) company. He subsequently left MGM in 1984 to sign with Paramount Pictures to produce films and TV shows.

He also produced the Emmy Award–⁠winning television film Something About Amelia, which aired on ABC in 1984. It was one of the highest-rated television films of the year, watched by around 60–⁠70 million people.

Goldberg served as president of 20th Century Fox from 1987 to 1989, during which time the studio produced such films as Broadcast News, Big, Die Hard, Wall Street and Working Girl. Under his own banner, Leonard Goldberg produced the successful motion picture features WarGames, Sleeping with the Enemy, Double Jeopardy and the Charlie's Angels films series. He also produced Unknown, starring Liam Neeson, Diane Kruger, January Jones and Frank Langella, released in theaters in February 2011. After he left 20th Century Fox in 1989, he moved to The Walt Disney Studios to serve as a film producer, before going back to Fox to sign a feature film production contract. In the late 1990s, he worked at Universal Studios as a film producer.

He has a star on the Hollywood Walk of Fame at 6901 Hollywood Boulevard and was inducted into the Academy of Television Arts and Sciences Hall of Fame in 2007. He was a member of the Wilshire Boulevard Temple.

Goldberg served on the CBS Board of Directors from 2007 to 2018.

Personal life and death
In 1972, he married Wendy Howard. He had one daughter, Amanda Erin Goldberg and two stepsons, Richard Mirisch and John A. Mirisch.

Goldberg died at Cedars-Sinai Medical Center in Los Angeles on December 4, 2019, as a result of injuries sustained in a fall. He was 85 years old.

Filmography
He was a producer in all films unless otherwise noted.

Film

As an actor

Television

Thanks

References

External links
 
 

1934 births
2019 deaths
20th-century American Jews
Film producers from New York (state)
Television producers from New York City
20th Century Studios people
American Broadcasting Company executives
American Broadcasting Company Vice Presidents of Programs
New Utrecht High School alumni
Wharton School of the University of Pennsylvania alumni
Deaths from falls
21st-century American Jews